The Golden Melody Award for Best Hakka Album is an honor presented at the Golden Melody Awards, a ceremony that was established in 1990, to recording artists for quality Hakka language music albums. 

The honor was first presented in 2005 as Best Hakka Pop Vocal Album at the 16th Golden Melody Awards to the album Evening. In 2007, the category became known as Best Hakka Album.

Recipients

References 

Golden Melody Awards
Album awards